William John Paskin (born 1 February 1962) is a South African former professional footballer who made 164 appearances in the Football League playing for West Bromwich Albion, Wolverhampton Wanderers, Stockport County, Birmingham City, Shrewsbury Town, Wrexham and Bury. He also played in South Africa, in the North American Soccer League, in Hong Kong, Belgium and Norway. He played as a forward.

Career
Paskin was born in Cape Town. He began his football career domestically with Hellenic, then spent the 1984 North American Soccer League season with Toronto Blizzard. He played 16 games and scored 10 goals, including scoring in the second game of the three-game Championship Game series: Toronto lost that game 3–2 and lost the series 2–0 to the Chicago Sting. Paskin's next port of call was Hong Kong, where he played for South China and Seiko, and represented Hong Kong against the South Korean national team in the 1986 Chinese New Year Cup. In the 1986–87 Belgian First Division season, he played for K.V. Kortrijk.

Paskin made his Football League debut for West Bromwich Albion in the 1988–99 season, and played 25 league games before moving on to Wolverhampton Wanderers for a fee of £75,000 at the end of the season. He scored only three goals in his 34 league appearances for the club, and spent periods on loan at Stockport County, Birmingham City and Shrewsbury Town, before joining Wrexham on a free transfer in February 1992. Paskin scored 14 goals from 60 games in all competitions for the club, and in July 1994 signed for Bury on a free transfer. He played quite frequently in his first season at Bury, though more often as a substitute, then sustained an injury which kept him out for much of the 1995–96 season. By the end of that season he was anxious to leave the club, and was released in May 1996.

He spent a few weeks with Fredrikstad FK in the Norwegian Second Division before finishing his career in his native South Africa with his former club Hellenic.

References

External links
 
 
 Toronto Blizzard profile

1962 births
Living people
Sportspeople from Cape Town
South African soccer players
South African expatriate soccer players
Association football forwards
Hellenic F.C. players
Toronto Blizzard (1971–1984) players
Birmingham City F.C. players
South China AA players
Seiko SA players
K.V. Kortrijk players
West Bromwich Albion F.C. players
Wolverhampton Wanderers F.C. players
Stockport County F.C. players
Shrewsbury Town F.C. players
Wrexham A.F.C. players
Bury F.C. players
Cape Town Spurs F.C. players
Fredrikstad FK players
North American Soccer League (1968–1984) players
Belgian Pro League players
English Football League players
Hong Kong First Division League players
Expatriate footballers in Hong Kong
South African expatriate sportspeople in Hong Kong
Expatriate footballers in England
South African expatriate sportspeople in England
Expatriate footballers in Wales
South African expatriate sportspeople in Wales
Expatriate footballers in Norway
South African expatriate sportspeople in Norway
Expatriate footballers in Belgium
South African expatriate sportspeople in Belgium
Expatriate soccer players in Canada
South African expatriate sportspeople in Canada
White South African people